Bali Ram  is a member of Lok Sabha, Lower House of the Parliament of India. He was elected to 15th Lok Sabha in 2009 as a representative of Lalganj, a parliamentary constituency in the state of Uttar Pradesh.

He holds the master's degree in Education and Doctorate from Banaras Hindu University.

Social and cultural activities
He is associated with social transformation activities and for the upliftment of lower strata, downtrodden, Scheduled Caste, Scheduled Tribes in his Constituencies.

References

External links
Lok Sabha

1968 births
Living people
India MPs 2009–2014
Bahujan Samaj Party politicians from Uttar Pradesh
Lok Sabha members from Uttar Pradesh
India MPs 1999–2004
India MPs 1996–1997
Politicians from Azamgarh district